The French Quarter is the oldest section of the city of New Orleans, Louisiana, United States.

French Quarter may also refer to:

 French Quarter, Philadelphia, Pennsylvania, United States
 French Quarter (Charleston, South Carolina), United States
 Belden Place, sometimes called the French Quarter, San Francisco, California, United States
 French Quarter, or Ville Blanche, in Puducherry, India
 French Quarter, or Soulard, in St. Louis, Missouri, United States
 French Quarter (film), a 1978 American drama film

French quarter, the generic term, is also widely used, often as a historical reference; see for instance:

 Soho, the French Huguenot quarter of London, England, in the 17th and 18th centuries
 Ba Đình District, the former French quarter of Hanoi, Vietnam
 Saint Boniface, Winnipeg, Manitoba, Canada
 Seton Hill Historic District, the historic French quarter of Baltimore, Maryland, United States

See also
 French Quarter Festival 
 French Settlement
 French Concession
 Frenchtown (disambiguation)